Abdelkrim Ouakali (born March 19, 1993) is an Algerian Greco-Roman wrestler. He was the winner of the 2019 African Games Greco-Roman 77 kg category.

In 2021, he competed at the 2021 African & Oceania Wrestling Olympic Qualification Tournament hoping to qualify for the 2020 Summer Olympics in Tokyo, Japan. He did not qualify at this tournament and he also failed to qualify for the Olympics at the World Olympic Qualification Tournament held in Sofia, Bulgaria.

He won the gold medal in his event at the 2022 African Wrestling Championships held in El Jadida, Morocco.

Major results

Doping sanction
In 14 February 2015 Ouakali had produce positive doping test at the 2015 Algerian National Championships. He used Furosemide and he was banned between March 12, 2015 - March 11, 2019.

References

External links
 

1993 births
Living people
Algerian male sport wrestlers
Wrestlers at the 2010 Summer Youth Olympics
Competitors at the 2019 African Games
African Games gold medalists for Algeria
African Games medalists in wrestling
Doping cases in wrestling
Competitors at the 2013 Mediterranean Games
Competitors at the 2022 Mediterranean Games
Mediterranean Games competitors for Algeria
Mediterranean Games silver medalists for Algeria
African Wrestling Championships medalists
21st-century Algerian people